The Maggie Taylor's roundleaf bat (Hipposideros maggietaylorae) is a species of bat in the family Hipposideridae. It is found in West Papua (Indonesia) and Papua New Guinea.

Taxonomy and etymology
It was described as a new species in 1981 by James Dale Smith and J. Edwards Hill. The holotype had been collected in 1979 in Lengmebung Cave on New Ireland Island. The eponym for the species name "maggietaylorae" is Margaret (Maggie) Taylor. Taylor had financed Smith's research expedition to the Bismarck Archipelago in 1979.

Description
It has dense, woolly fur that is shorter on the head and neck than the rest of the body. Its back fur is grayish brown, while its belly fur is grayish white.

Range and habitat
It is found on the island of New Guinea (both the Indonesian and the Papua New Guinean sides) as well as several islands of the Bismarck Archipelago of Papua New Guinea.

Conservation
As of 2008, it is evaluated as a least-concern species by the IUCN. No major threats to this species have been identified.

References

Hipposideros
Bats of Oceania
Mammals of Papua New Guinea
Mammals of Western New Guinea
Mammals described in 1981
Taxa named by John Edwards Hill
Taxonomy articles created by Polbot
Bats of Southeast Asia
Bats of New Guinea